Jamie Barjonas (born 24 January 1999) is a Scottish professional footballer who plays as a midfielder for Kelty Hearts.

Club career
Barjonas joined Rangers Academy as a nine-year-old. He signed a new contract in March 2016 which tied him to the club until May 2018. Barjonas made his debut for Rangers in a Scottish Premiership match against Partick Thistle on 7 May 2017, coming on as a 71st-minute substitute in a 2–1 win for the Gers.

On 15 August 2018, Barjonas joined League Two side Bury on loan until January 2019. He then moved on loan to Raith Rovers in January 2019, for the rest of the 2018/19 season. Barjonas was loaned to Ayr United in March 2021.

Barjonas signed for Kelty Hearts on 2 June 2021.

International career
Barjonas has represented Scotland at various age levels.

He was born in Leeds, Yorkshire to Scottish parents, and the family moved back to Scotland when he was a small child. His uncommon surname originates from a Lithuanian great-grandfather.

Career statistics

References

External links

1999 births
Living people
Scottish footballers
Scotland youth international footballers
English footballers
Scottish people of Lithuanian descent
English people of Scottish descent
English people of Lithuanian descent
Association football midfielders
Rangers F.C. players
Scottish Professional Football League players
Bury F.C. players
English Football League players
Raith Rovers F.C. players
Partick Thistle F.C. players
Ayr United F.C. players
Kelty Hearts F.C. players